Vedad Ibišević (born 6 August 1984) is a Bosnian former professional footballer who played as a forward. He is currently assistant head coach of Hertha BSC.

Ibišević started his professional career at Paris Saint-Germain. He had a two-year loan stint with Dijon, and afterwards went to Germany, where he played for Alemannia Aachen, 1899 Hoffenheim, VfB Stuttgart, before eventually settling in Hertha BSC and later Schalke 04. In 2008, he was awarded the Idol Nacije award for Bosnian Footballer of the Year.

A former youth international for Bosnia and Herzegovina, Ibišević made his senior international debut in 2007. He earned 83 caps and scored 28 goals until 2018. Ibišević scored a goal that took Bosnia and Herzegovina to the 2014 FIFA World Cup, the nation's first major tournament. He also scored their first ever goal at the tournament.

Club career

Early career
Ibišević was born in Vlasenica, Bosnia and Herzegovina, then a republic within SFR Yugoslavia. He and his family left Bosnia and Herzegovina in 2000 to move to Switzerland, where Ibišević was signed by FC Baden in Canton Aargau. His family, however, left Switzerland after only ten months, moving to St. Louis, Missouri, in the United States. In St. Louis, Ibišević flourished as one of the region's most promising football players, and after his senior season in 2002, was named by Soccer America as one of the nation's top 25 recruits. He played his high school football at Roosevelt High School in St. Louis.

Ibišević signed to play college soccer in his adopted hometown at one of the nation's most respected football establishments, Saint Louis University. He quickly established himself in his freshman year, registering 18 goals and four assists in 22 games for the Billikens, while leading a strong SLU team deep into the NCAA Tournament. For his achievements, Ibišević was named the NCAA Freshman of the Year, as well as a first team All-American. During his college years, he also played in the Premier Development League with both the St. Louis Strikers and Chicago Fire Premier.

During training with the team, Ibišević was spotted by Paris Saint-Germain's Bosnian manager Vahid Halilhodžić, who quickly signed him to play for the renowned French team for the coming season. Ibišević, however, initially saw little action, and was loaned to French second division club Dijon.

1899 Hoffenheim

In May 2006, Ibišević signed a three-year deal with Alemannia Aachen, and on 12 July 2007, he moved to another German club, 1899 Hoffenheim. At the time, the club competed in 2. Bundesliga, where they got promoted in the previous season. At the end of Ibišević's first season, the club managed to get promoted once again, this time to Bundesliga for the first time in their history.

Ibišević kicked off the 2008–09 season in good fashion, scoring two goals in 1899 Hoffenheim's first ever appearance in Bundesliga against Energie Cottbus with the game ending in a 3–0 win. He scored another goal on his second game against Borussia Mönchengladbach, giving his team the victory. In his third Bundesliga match for the club, he scored his fourth goal of the season against Bayer Leverkusen, although his side lost 5–2. He scored another two goals in 4–1 win over Borussia Dortmund. He even scored a goal against Bayern Munich at the Allianz Arena in a 1–2 loss. During the first half of 1899 Hoffenheim's debut season in the top flight, Ibišević recorded 18 goals and seven assists in 17 games, making him the league's top scorer before he was injured. He was voted Bundesliga Player of the Month for October 2008.

On 14 January 2009, during the Bundesliga's winter break, Ibišević was injured in a training match against Hamburger SV in Spain. The final examination confirmed an anterior right cruciate ligament rupture, which took him out of action for the rest of the season.

Ibišević returned at the beginning of the 2009–10 season. He was scoreless until 1899 Hoffenheim's seventh Bundesliga match, when he scored a hat-trick against Hertha BSC in a remarkable comeback. This became the fifth-fastest hat-trick in Bundesliga history and the fastest goal scored that season, scored 44 seconds into the match. The only time when he again scored more than a single goal in that season was against Hamburger SV on 25 April 2010. After the season, he signed a contract extension that would have kept him at the club until June 2013.

His third season started with a goal and assist against Werder Bremen on 21 August 2010. Ibišević scored his only brace of the season in a 4–0 win over Eintracht Frankfurt.

Ibišević injured his thigh muscle in July 2011 and missed the opening seven games of the season.

VfB Stuttgart
On 25 January 2012, Ibišević moved to VfB Stuttgart. He debuted for his new club just four days later against Borussia Mönchengladbach playing 90 minutes, and scored his first goal, the opening one, on 11 February 2012 in a 5–0 home victory against Hertha BSC. He also provided an assist in that match. Ibišević scored two more goals in a 2–1 derby victory over former club 1899 Hoffenheim on 16 March. His good form continued as he netted a brace in his side's emphatic 4–1 victory over Mainz 05, bringing Stuttgart ever closer to securing European competition for the next season.

Ibišević's first goal of the 2012–13 season came on 29 September 2012, scoring within the opening minute as VfB Stuttgart defeated 1. FC Nürnberg 2–0. On 8 December, Ibišević scored his first hat-trick for VfB Stuttgart, netting all three goals as the home side moved into fifth spot in the league with a 3–1 defeat of Schalke 04.

On 1 September 2013, Ibišević netted a hat-trick against former club Hoffenheim, powering his side to a 6–2 victory at the Mercedes-Benz Arena. He was given a five-match ban on 9 February for appearing to strike Jan-Ingwer Callsen-Bracker in a home defeat to FC Augsburg. The German Football Association's decision was reached as Ibišević was labelled as a "repeat offender", having been sent off for a similar offence at the start of the previous season. The suspension would cause him to miss a game against his former team, 1899 Hoffenheim, and bottom team Eintracht Braunschweig. Ibišević apologised for his actions.

On 6 August 2014, Ibišević extended his contract with VfB Stuttgart until June 2017. In October 2014, Ibišević broke his foot and subsequently missed nine games, returning in late January 2015.

Hertha BSC
Ibišević was loaned to Hertha BSC on 30 August 2015, making the deal permanent in July 2016. Ibišević debuted for his new club against VfB Stuttgart on 12 September 2015. On 22 September, he scored twice in a 2–0 home win over 1. FC Köln, ending a 25-game goal drought. On 3 October, Ibišević scored two goals in three minutes in a 3–0 win over Hamburger SV. On 17 October, Ibišević received a straight red card in the 18th minute against Schalke 04 for a challenge on Max Meyer in an eventual 2–1 loss, which got him suspended for four games. Ibišević scored his third brace of the season against Darmstadt 98 on 12 December to take his tally up to six for the season, with all his goals coming in pairs.

On 18 August 2016, Ibišević was named club's captain by head coach Pál Dárdai, replacing Fabian Lustenberger, who wore the armband for three years. On 27 November he scored his 100th goal in Bundesliga and became only the sixth foreigner in league's history to do so. The following day, he signed a new three-year contract with the club. On 5 March 2017, Ibišević played his 250th game in Bundesliga.

On 1 December 2018, in his 300th Bundesliga game, Ibišević scored a goal against Hannover 96. On 9 March 2018, in a match against Freiburg, Ibisevic scored an own goal, resulting in the 2–1 loss away from home. A week later, Ibisevic was subbed on for Salomon Kalou, taking the captain's armband during the latter stages of a home match against Borussia Dortmund. Having led the game twice, Hertha conceded in the 92nd minute making the score 3–2 to Dortmund. During the final minute of the game, Ibisevic was given a straight red card after VAR review, for throwing a ball and hitting the head of Dortmund keeper Roman Bürki.

Schalke 04
On 3 September 2020, Ibišević signed a one-year contract with Schalke 04. Just twelve weeks later, Schalke announced that his contract with the club would be terminated on 31 December 2020.

International career

Ibišević was part of Bosnia and Herzegovina under-21 team, playing five games and scoring one goal.

On 24 March 2007, Ibišević debuted as a starter for Bosnia and Herzegovina in a UEFA Euro 2008 qualifying match against Norway. On 13 October 2007, he scored his first international goal against Greece in Athens, in a 3–2 loss.

On 7 September 2012, Ibišević scored his first international hat-trick away to Liechtenstein. He has also set up Edin Džeko for another goal during the match. By scoring the only goal of the match against Lithuania on 15 October 2013, Ibišević ensured Bosnia would make its first ever appearance at a FIFA World Cup.

In June 2014, he was named in Bosnia's 23-man squad for the 2014 FIFA World Cup. He debuted in the opening group game of the competition and scored first ever Bosnian goal at the World Cup finals in a 1–2 loss against Argentina at the Maracanã Stadium.

In a penultimate UEFA Euro 2016 qualifier, due to absence of Edin Džeko, Ibišević started against Wales and scored a crucial goal in the 90th minute to keep Bosnia's qualification hopes alive.

Ibišević retired from international football at the end of Bosnia's unsuccessful 2018 World Cup qualifying campaign. He, along with Emir Spahić and Zvjezdan Misimović, was called up for a friendly game against Montenegro in May 2018, which Bosnian FA used to commemorate them for all of their achievements in the national team and to give the crowd one last chance to see them in the national jersey. They played the opening 20 minutes and the fans gave them a standing ovation as they were exiting the Bilino Polje turf.

Personal life
Ibišević is from a Bosniak family. At an early age, his family moved to Switzerland, and ten months later to St. Louis, Missouri in the United States. While he has spoken some about his experiences during the Bosnian War that forced his family to leave Bosnia, he is not known to have ever revealed all of the details. According to a profile on Ibišević by American writer Wright Thompson in 2014,

No one in Germany knows the whole story about his escape from the war. During his three years in St. Louis, he never told a single person at school, not a friend, teacher or coach. The most common answers he gives to any question about the war is "It's OK" or "We were lucky."

Even his wife Zerina, who lost her father in the war, believes her husband has not told her the whole story; in the Thompson piece, she said, "I still have a feeling that I know maybe 20 percent. I swear."

At the time of the Thompson story, Ibišević and his wife lived near Stuttgart with their young son Ismail. Thompson noted that when Ibišević looked for a house when he transferred to VfB Stuttgart, he "found himself drawn" to one that reminded him of the family home in Bosnia that they were forced to abandon during the war. He also bought a home for his father Šaban in Tuzla that had previously been owned by his father's employer, which according to Thompson was "a symbol of what the war had taken". The home is more a spiritual balm for Šaban, since he continues to live in St. Louis, where he manages apartment buildings that his son owns. Ibišević also rebuilt his father's boyhood home in their former village of Gerovi, and has built several war memorials in the area.

Ibišević and his wife Zerina (née Medić) became parents for the second time in October 2016. Zerina gave birth to a girl which they named Zejna. Their son Ismail was born in 2012.
 
Ibišević is a Muslim. During the 2014 World Cup, he, along with international teammates Muhamed Bešić and Edin Višća, visited a mosque in Cuiabá.

Ibišević's cousin, Elvir is also a footballer, and made his senior international debut for Bosnia and Herzegovina team on 28 January 2018.

Career statistics

Club

International

Scores and results list Bosnia and Herzegovina's goal tally first, score column indicates score after each Ibišević goal.

Honours
Individual
 Conference USA Men's Soccer Freshman of the Year: 2003
 Bosnian Footballer of the Year: 2008
 kicker Bundesliga Team of the Season: 2008–09
 ESM Team of the Year: 2008–09

References

External links

1984 births
Living people
People from Vlasenica
Bosniaks of Bosnia and Herzegovina
Bosnia and Herzegovina Muslims
Bosnia and Herzegovina refugees
Bosnia and Herzegovina emigrants to Switzerland
Bosnia and Herzegovina emigrants to the United States
Bosnia and Herzegovina footballers
Bosnia and Herzegovina under-21 international footballers
Bosnia and Herzegovina international footballers
Bosnia and Herzegovina expatriate footballers
Association football forwards
Saint Louis Billikens men's soccer players
St. Louis Strikers players
Chicago Fire U-23 players
Paris Saint-Germain F.C. players
Dijon FCO players
Alemannia Aachen players
TSG 1899 Hoffenheim players
VfB Stuttgart players
Hertha BSC players
FC Schalke 04 players
All-American men's college soccer players
USL League Two players
Ligue 1 players
Ligue 2 players
2. Bundesliga players
Bundesliga players
Expatriate footballers in Switzerland
Expatriate soccer players in the United States
Expatriate footballers in France
Expatriate footballers in Germany
Bosnia and Herzegovina expatriate sportspeople in Switzerland
Bosnia and Herzegovina expatriate sportspeople in the United States
Bosnia and Herzegovina expatriate sportspeople in France
Bosnia and Herzegovina expatriate sportspeople in Germany
2014 FIFA World Cup players